The Kerala Police is the law enforcement agency for the Indian state of Kerala. Kerala Police has its headquarters in Thiruvananthapuram, the state capital. The motto of the force is "Mridhu Bhave Dhrida Kruthye" which means "Soft in Temperament, Firm in Action" in Sanskrit.

Kerala Police has a reputation for being one of the best-managed state police forces in the nation, and the state ranks among the top states for maintaining law and order. One of the first police forces in South Asia to put community policing into practise is Kerala Police, which was one of the first to do so through legislation. The term "Janamaithri" Policing, which means "people-friendly Policing," is used to refer to it.

According to the data from Bureau of Police Research and Development (BPRD), there are a total of 564 police stations in Kerala. Out of these, 382 police stations are located in rural areas, while 102 police stations are located in urban areas. Additionally, there are 80 special purpose police stations in Kerala.

The rural police stations account for the majority of police stations in Kerala, comprising approximately 68% of the total. The urban police stations account for about 18% of the total, while the special purpose police stations account for about 14% of the total.

History 
Prior to independence, the Kerala Police was governed by different administrations.

Kerala Police traces its roots to the erstwhile Travancore State Police, which was established in 1936. After the integration of the princely states of Travancore and Cochin, the present-day Kerala Police was formed in 1956. The first Director General of Police of Kerala Police was Shri. T. K. Joseph IPS

Current office holders

Organization 

Kerala Police is headed by the State Police Chief. He is the senior most Indian Police Service officer in the State and is of the rank of Director General of Police. State Police Chief is designated as the Head of the department for all administrative and operational purposes. State Police Chief is assisted by officers in the rank of Additional Director General of Police.

Law and Order
Additional DGP (ADGP, L&O) heads this wing. The state of Kerala is divided into two police zones, North Zone and South Zone. each zone is headed by The Inspector Generals of Police (IGP). The office of IGP North zone is located at Nadakkavu in Kozhikkode district and the office of IGP South zone is located at Nandavanam, in Thiruvananthapuram district. There are 20 police districts in Kerala. All the police districts of Kerala are co-terminus with the boundaries of Revenue districts except six districts. The six Revenue districts which are divided into two police districts each are Thiruvananthapuram (Thiruvanathapuram city and Thrivanathapuram rural police districts), Ernakulam (Kochi city and Ernakulam Rural police districts), Kollam (Kollam city and Kollam rural police districts), Kozhikode (Kozhikode city and Kozhikode rural), Thrissur (Thrissur city and Thrissur rural) and Kannur (Kannur City and Kannur Rural).

Each police district is headed by a District Police Chief with the rank of Superintendent of Police except for Thiruvananthapuram City and Kochi City, which are headed by officers with the rank of Inspector General of Police, and Kozhikode City, which is headed by an officer with the rank of Deputy Inspector General Police. Each Police district is divided into some subdivisions to supervise activities of several police stations under its jurisdiction. There are 91 police sub-divisions in Kerala. Each sub-division is headed by a Deputy Superintendent of Police (DySP) or an Assistant Commissioner of Police (ACP) in the case of city police sub-divisions.

The police officer in charge of a sub division is called Sub Divisional Police Officer (SDPO). DySPs or ASPs are posted as SDPOs. The Sub Divisional Offices are headed by Sub Divisional Police Officers in the rank of Deputy superintendent of police or Assistant superintendent of police. A Sub Division is further divided into Police Station areas, each of which is under an Inspector of Police designated as Station House Officer (SHO). Inspectors in charge of police stations are known as Inspector SHOs (ISHO). In small police stations sub-inspectors are appointed as SHOs.  The SHO is assisted by Sub Inspectors of Police, Assistant Sub Inspectors of Police, Senior Civil Police Officers and Civil Police Officers. The section known as General Executive is working in the police stations of Kerala.

 Police Zones are headed by a Inspector General of Police (IGPs)
 Police Ranges are headed by a Deputy Inspector General of Police (DIGs)
 Police Districts are headed by a District Police Chief of the rank of Superintendent of Police (SPs)
 Thiruvananthapuram City and Ernakulam City Police districts are headed by a District Police Chief of the rank of Inspector General of Police (IG). Kozhikode City Police district is headed by a District Police Chief of the rank of Deputy Inspector General of Police (DIG).
 The IGs of cities reports directly to Additional Director General of Police, L&O

Hierarchy

Officers

 Director General of Police & State Police Chief (DGP & SPC)
 Additional Director General of Police (ADGP)
 Inspector General of Police (IG)
 Deputy Inspector General of Police (DIG)
 Superintendent of Police (SP)
 Additional Superintendent of Police (Addl.SP)
 Assistant Superintendent of Police (ASP) [IPS]
 Deputy Superintendent of Police (DySP) KPS

Sub-ordinates
 Inspector of Police (IP)
 Sub-Inspector of Police (SI)
 Assistant Sub-Inspector of Police (ASI)
 Senior Civil Police Officer (SCPO)
 Civil Police Officer (CPO)

Insignia of Kerala Police (State Police)

Police Commissionerates
Thiruvananthapuram City Police and Kochi City Police are headed by Commissioner of Police of the rank of Inspector General of Police. Kozhikode City Police is headed by the Commissioner of Police of the rank of Deputy Inspector General of Police. Thrissur City Police, Kannur City Police and Kollam City Police are headed by Commissioner of Police of the rank of Superintendent of Police. The Commissioner of Police is assisted by Deputy Commissioners of Police (DCPs) of the rank of Deputy Inspector General of Police or Superintendent of Police and Assistant Commissioners of Police (ACPs) of the rank of Deputy Superintendent of Police.

Crime Branch 

The Crime Branch is the specialized investigation wing of the Kerala police. It is headed by an officer of the rank of Additional Director General of Police.

Crime Branch investigates cases that are entrusted to it by the State Police Chief or the Government or the High Court of Kerala. The Cyber Crime Police Stations and Hi-Tech Crime Enquiry Cell of the Kerala Police are functioning under the Crime Branch. This department was earlier known as Crime Branch-Criminal Investigation Department (CBCID).

Crime Branch is the Nodal agency for Interpol related matters in the State and conducts verifications or enquiries on behalf of Interpol.

Crime Branch is specialized in investigation of complex organized crimes, financial frauds, economic offences with huge ramifications, undetected or sensitive crime cases, cases with inter-state ramifications, etc.

Apart from this, the District Crime Branch     (C-Branch) functions under the respective District Police Chiefs. District C-Branch is headed by a Deputy Superintendent of Police. District C Branch acts as specialized investigating wing of District Police Chief which is mandated to help in investigating sensational cases at the district level.

Hierarchy of Crime Branch 

 Addtl. Director General of Police (Crimes)
 Inspector General of Police (CB IG)
 Crime Branch, Superintendent of Police   (CB SP)
 Crime Branch, Deputy Superintendent of Police (CB DySP)
 Detective Inspector
 Detective Sub Inspector
 Detective Assistant Sub Inspector
 Detective Sr. Police Officer
 Detective Police Officer

State Special Branch

The State Special Branch is the intelligence wing of the Kerala police. This wing is headed by an officer of the rank of Additional Director General of Police. The ADGP (Intelligence) is assisted by Inspector Generals of Police, Deputy Inspector Generals of Police, Superintendents of Police and Subordinate officers. State Special Branch (SSB) is primarily concerned with the collection, collation and dissemination of intelligence on and about various political, communal, terrorist, national security, labour activities and with relation to various law and order issues like agitations, strikes, demonstrations, protests, etc. The SSB is functioning as the eyes and ears of the Government.

Armed police battalions

This wing is headed by an officer of the rank of Additional Director General of Police  (ADGP APBn). There are eleven armed police battalions in the state, which serve as reserve forces to be deployed whenever and wherever district police fall short of manpower in the maintenance of law and order. Each battalion is headed by a Commandant of the rank of Superintendent of Police. Malabar Special Police is the oldest paramilitary force of India after Assam Rifles.

Battalions 
Kerala Armed Police KAP-I (Thrissur)
Kerala Armed Police KAP-II (Palakkad)
Kerala Armed Police-III (Adoor)
Kerala Armed Police-IV (Kannur)
Kerala Armed Police-V (Kuttikanam)
Malabar Special Police- MSP (Malappuram)
Special Armed Police - SAP                             (Thiruvananthapuram)
Rapid Response and Rescue Force - RRRF     (Pandikkad)
India Reserve Battalion (IRBn) (Thrissur)
State Industrial Security Force [SISF]
Armed Women Police Battalion [AWPBn]

Hierarchy of Armed Police
 Additional Director General of Police (APBn)
 Deputy Inspector General of Police (APBn)
 Commandant (equivalent to SP)
 Deputy Commandant (equivalent to rank of Addl.SP)
 Assistant Commandant (equivalent to rank of DySP)
 Armed Police Inspector
 Armed Police Sub Inspector
 Armed Police Asst. Sub Inspector
 Havildar
 Armed Police Head Constable
 Armed Police Constable

Specialized Units

Tourism Police
Tourism Police wing has been functioning in the state for maintaining law and order, preventing attack and harassment on tourists. They also assist the tourists for getting tourist related information, guidance, etc. The uniform of Tourism Police Officers is sky blue shirt and khakee pants. International Tourism Police Station and Police Museum at Mattancherry in Ernakulam district is the first of its kind in the country which not only addresses grievances of tourists but also showcases the history of the Kerala Police. The primary aim of the station is to make the state of Kerala more tourist-friendly.

Coastal Police 
Coastal Police Stations handle the security of the coasts and carry out the patrolling in the sea up to 12 nautical miles. The cases reported on the sea (in the Territorial Waters) will be investigated by the Coastal Police. The headquarters of Kerala Coastal Police is situated at Kochi.

Railway Police 
The responsibility of the Kerala Railway Police is to maintain law and order, prevent and detect crime on the railways and railway stations in Kerala.

The Superintendent of Police (Railways) is under supervision of A.D.G.P (Intelligence & Railways). There are 13 Railway Police Stations in Kerala. They are located in the main Railway station premises at Trivandrum Central, Parassala, Kollam, Punalur, Alappuzha, Kottayam, Ernakulam Junction, Thrissur, Shornur, Palakkad, Kozhikode, Kannur and Kasargod.

Pink Police Patrol 
The main objectives of Pink Patrol are to prevent violence and crimes against women and children. As part of improving women safety in public places, Kerala Police has rolled out a special patrol team called pink patrol with all women police officers, patrolling across all the busy areas of the various cities of Kerala. The team has been allotted pink Maruti Suzuki sedan cars. The Pink patrol vehicles are fitted with GPS and other smart equipments for faster response and assistance as well as has on-board cameras and scanning systems to identify potential offenders.

Narcotic Cell
Narcotic Cell collects intelligence on Narcotic Drugs and Psychotropic Substances (NDPS) and pass it on to concerned police stations according to the gravity of cases. Monitoring and Supervising cases registered under NDPS Act is also done by this wing. Abkari raids are being conducted by Narcotic Cell on information. 
District Narcotic Cell is functioning in all police districts, headed by an officer of the rank of Deputy Superintendent of Police, and under supervision of District Police Chiefs.

Women Cell 
State Women Cell is headed by the Lady Superintendent of Police. In addition, One District Women Cell is also functioning in all Police Districts, each headed by a Woman Inspector. The State Women Cell is functioning at the Police Headquarters in Thiruvananthapuram. The first Woman Police Station started at Kozhikode in 1973.

Thunderbolts 

Thunderbolts is the elite commando unit of Kerala Police. It performs perilous counter-terrorism, jungle-warfare, and hostage-rescue operations. Thunderbolts are a form of SPG and NSG, which are trained to take on air, water and land attacks.

Recruitment
IPS officers are recruited through the Civil Service Examination conducted by the Union Public Service Commission (UPSC). They are also promoted from the State Police Service. The first posting of a direct recruit IPS officer is to the post of Assistant Superintendent of Police.

According to the Indian Police Service (Appointment by Promotion) Regulations, 1955, Kerala Police Service officers are eligible for promotion to the IPS after completing eight years of service. But in reality, officers are generally promoted to the IPS after two and a half decades of service. KPS or State Police Service officers are inducted into the IPS by promotion from the rank of Superintendent of Police (non-IPS). After completing two decades of service, KPS officers get promoted to the Indian Police Service, after confirmation by the Ministry of Home Affairs of the Government of India and the Union Public Service Commission. One-third of the total IPS strength in Kerala is reserved for KPS officers (SPS quota).

Unlike other state police forces, there is no direct recruitment for the Group A (gazetted) post of Deputy Superintendent of Police in the Kerala Police. Recruitment to the Kerala Police Service (Group-A) is by promotion from the rank of Inspector of Police. 

Recruitment to the post of Sub Inspector of Police (Trainee) to the Kerala Civil Police Cadre is done through the competitive exam and departmental promotion tests conducted by the Kerala Public Service Commission. Recruitment to the post of Sub Inspector (General Executive) is done through direct and indirect means in the ratio of 1:1.

Recruitment to the post of Civil Police Officer in the Kerala civil police cadre is done through a competitive exam conducted by the Kerala Public Service Commission. Apart from this, the Kerala PSC conducts direct recruitment for various technical and special category posts like police constable (driver), armed police constable, police constable (commando wing), police constable (telecom), fingerprint expert, forensic expert, etc.

Training
The training wing of state police is headed by an officer of the rank of Additional Director General of Police (Training).

Kerala Police Academy 
The Kerala Police Academy is headed by the Director of the rank of Additional Director General of Police. The Director is assisted by Joint Directors, assistant directors, HODs,etc. The academy is situated at Thrissur. The academy will cater to the training needs of all officers of police department including IPS officers.

Police Training College 
The head of Police Training College is Principal in the rank of Superintendent of Police. It is situated in Thiruvananthapuram. The Basic Training and In-service courses are key Training programmes carried out in PTC. Apart from giving Basic Training, many In-Service Courses such as Refresher courses, Re-orientation courses, Familiarization courses, Cader courses are also being undertaken at PTC. Basic training for Excise Inspectors, Forest Officers are also now being conducted. Training of Probationary Officers is carried out in PTC.

Positions (Ranks) 
The ranks in the Kerala Police range from Civil Police Officer (CPO) to DGP.

The Government of Kerala has decided to give Grade Senior Civil Police Officer (SCPO Grade) Rank to Civil Police Officers who have completed 12 years of service from 2020, Senior Civil Police Officers who have completed 20 years of service will be given the rank of Grade Assistant Sub Inspector (ASI Grade) and Assistant Sub Inspectors who have completed 25 years of service from 2019 will be given the rank of Grade Sub Inspector (SI Grade). They will continue to carry the duties and responsibilities of the rank when they receive the honorary grade.

Designations

List of Former Chiefs

Achievements
Kerala Chief Minister Pinarayi Vijayan has termed Kerala Police as best in the country. In 2021 Kerala Police bagged the National e-Governance Award.
Kerala Police has achieved several significant milestones over the years. Some of the notable achievements include:

Women Police Stations: Kerala Police was the first in the country to establish women police stations, which exclusively deal with crimes against women.

Cyberdome: Kerala Police established Cyberdome, a state-of-the-art facility for cyber security and cybercrime investigation.

Janamaithri Suraksha: Kerala Police launched the Janamaithri Suraksha Project, a community policing initiative aimed at building a relationship of trust between the police and the public.

Pink Patrol: Kerala Police launched Pink Patrol, a patrol team consisting of women police officers, to ensure the safety and security of women in public places.

 The Public Affairs Index selected Kerala as the best state in 2016 and 2017 considering its excellence in law and order.
 According to the grading conducted by Plan India for Women's Safety, Kerala ranks second in the country in terms of ensuring women's safety (Gender Vulnerability Index).
 Valapatnam Police Station has been selected as one of the top ten police stations in the country based on the inspection and study of the Union Ministry of Home Affairs. The handling of criminal cases, effective implementation of anti-drug activities and public involvement of the police helped the Valapatanam police station to achieve this achievement.
 COPS Today International, a journal published by the Foundation for Research, recently honored Kerala Police's Community Policing Program Janmaitri Police Project with the Police Excellence Award.

Controversies 
Kerala Police has also faced several controversies over the years. Some of the notable controversies include:

Custodial Deaths: Kerala Police has faced allegations of custodial deaths, where suspects died in police custody.

Encounter Killings: Kerala Police has faced allegations of fake encounter killings, where suspects were killed in fake encounters.

Police Brutality: Kerala Police has faced allegations of police brutality, where suspects were subjected to excessive force during arrest or interrogation.
There have been several allegations of irregularities and brutalities by Kerala Police officials. Kerala Police has been accused of failure in curbing violence and failure to act on intelligence reports. Indian poet Dr Tapan Kumar Pradhan in his books and social media posts has exposed several irregularities in criminal investigation by Kerala Police, especially in Hemangi Sharma Fraud Case.

In Popular Culture 
Members of the Kerala Police have been frequently portrayed in Malayalam films. Some of the prominent ones are: 
Thondimuthalum Driksakshiyum
Action Hero Biju
Abrahaminte Santhathikal
Christopher (film)
Grandmaster
Villain
Nayattu
Salute (2022 film)
Night Drive (film)
Kuttavum Shikshayum (2022 film)
Drishyam
Drishyam 2
Mumbai Police (film)
Memories
Anjaam Pathiraa
Pathaam Valavu
Cold Case
Traffic
Joseph
John Luther (film)
Aavanazhi
Inspector Balram
Crime File
Baba Kalyani (film)
Bharathchandran I.P.S.
Commissioner (film)

See also 
 Kerala Thunderbolts
 Kerala Vigilance & Anti-Corruption Bureau
 Department of Home (Kerala)
 Law enforcement in India
 Police forces of the states and union territories of India
Kerala Prisons and Correctional Services
M. Abdul Sathar Kunju
Jayaram Padikkal

Notes

References

External links 
 

Kerala Police
Year of establishment missing
State law enforcement agencies of India